An armadillo is a mammal with an armored shell.

Armadillo may also refer to:

Film, literature, video games, music 
 Armadillo (2010 film), a 2010 Danish documentary about the war in Afghanistan
 Armadillo (2001 film), a 2001 British TV film starring James Frain
 Armadillo (comics), a Marvel Comics villain
 Armadillo (magazine),  a web-based magazine
 Armadillo (novel), a novel by William Boyd
 Armadillo (video game), a 1991 NES/Family Computer game
 Armadillo (G.I. Joe), a fictional character in the G.I. Joe universe
 Armadillo Quintero, a villain from the television series The Shield
 The Armadillo, poem by Elizabeth Bishop

Places 
 Armadillo World Headquarters, a music hall and entertainment center in Austin, Texas between 1970 and 1980
 SEC Armadillo or Clyde Auditorium, an iconic concert venue in Glasgow, Scotland
 Forward Operating Base Armadillo, military base near Girishk, Afghanistan

Military 
 16th Armored Division (United States), nicknamed Armadillo
 Armadillo armoured fighting vehicle, an extemporised armoured fighting vehicle, from Britain in 1940
 Armadillo-class tanker, a type of ship commissioned into the United States Navy
 Armadillo (APC), a Guatemalan built and operated armoured personnel carrier

Other 
Armadillo (crustacean), a genus of woodlice in the family Armadillidae
 Armadillo (protein), a Drosophila protein that is homologous to mammalian beta-catenin
 Armadillo (C++ library), a software library for linear algebra
 Armadillo Aerospace, an aerospace company led by John Carmack that has seized operations